Qalatak may refer to:
 Qalatak, Chaharmahal and Bakhtiari
 Qalatak, Fars
 Qalatak, Kohgiluyeh and Boyer-Ahmad